The 46th Signal Regiment is a national support signals regiment of the Italian Army based in Palermo in Sicily and Nocera Inferiore in Campania. The unit was formed in 1976 as a battalion named for Mount Mongibello. The battalion operated and maintained the army's telecommunication network on the island of Sicily. In 1997 the battalion entered the newly formed 46th Signal Regiment, which in 1998 joined the army's Signal Command. In 2001 the regiment received the Battalion "Vulture" from the disbanded 45th Signal Regiment, which operated and maintained the army's telecommunication network in southern Italy. Since then the regiment operates and maintains the army's telecommunication network in southern Italy and Sicily.

History 
On 1 January 1953 the 11th Connections Company was raised for the XI Territorial Military Command in Palermo. On 1 September 1956 the company was renamed 6th Signal Company.

During the 1975 army reform the army disbanded the regimental level and newly independent battalions were granted for the first time their own flags. During the reform signal battalions were renamed for mountain passes or volcanoes. In preparation for the reform the 6th Signal Company was renamed 46th Signal Company on 15 November 1975. On 1 May 1976 the company was expanded to 46th Signal Battalion "Mongibello". The battalion consisted of a command, a command and services platoon, and two signal companies. The battalion was assigned to the Signal Command of the Sicily Military Region and operated and maintained the army's telecommunication network on the island of Sicily and in the province of Reggio Calabria. On 12 November 1976 the battalion was granted a flag by decree 846 of the President of the Italian Republic Giovanni Leone.

In 1985 the command and services platoon was expanded to command and services company and a third signal company was formed.

On 1 September 1997 the battalion was transferred to the Southern Area Logistic Command. On 27 October 1997 the 46th Signal Battalion "Mongibello" lost its autonomy and the next day the battalion entered the newly formed 46th Signal Regiment as Battalion "Mongibello". On the same date the flag of the 46th Signal Battalion "Mongibello" was transferred from the battalion to the 46th Signal Regiment.

On 1 October 1998 the regiment joined the army's C4 IEW Command. On 1 January 2001 the regiment received the Battalion "Vulture" from the disbanded 45th Signal Regiment in Nocera Inferiore and on 10 September of the same year the regiment received the 25th C4 Maintenance Unit in San Giorgio a Cremano.

Current structure 
As of 2023 the 46th Signal Regiment operates and maintains the army's telecommunication network in the Apulia, Basilicata, Calabria, Campania, Molise, and Sicily regions and consists of:

  Regimental Command, in Palermo
 Command and Logistic Support Company, in Palermo
  Battalion "Mongibello", in Palermo
 1st Area Support Signal Company
 2nd C4 Support Signal Company
  Battalion "Vulture", in Nocera Inferiore
 Command and Logistic Support Company
 3rd Area Support Signal Company
 4th C4 Support Signal Company
 11th C4 Maintenance Unit, in Palermo
 25th C4 Maintenance Unit, in San Giorgio a Cremano
 25th C4 Maintenance Unit Detachment, in Bari
 Computer Incident Response Team, in Palermo

The Command and Logistic Support Company fields the following platoons: C3 Platoon, Transport and Materiel Platoon, Medical Platoon, and Commissariat Platoon. The Battalion "Mongibello" covers Sicily and Calabria, while the Battalion "Vulture" covers Campania, Basilicata, and Apulia.

External links
Italian Army Website: 46° Reggimento Trasmissioni

References

Signal Regiments of Italy